The Cottonwood River Bridge is a historic bridge across the Cottonwood River at the north edge of Cottonwood Falls, Kansas. The bridge was built in 1914 by the Missouri Valley Bridge and Iron Company, who bid $13,700 for its contract. Lead builder F. L. Rice used a concrete spandrel arch plan for the bridge, a contemporary design which has since fallen out of use. The bridge is currently closed to vehicle traffic and is used as a fishing site for a local park.

The bridge was added to the National Register of Historic Places on July 2, 1985.

References

		
National Register of Historic Places in Chase County, Kansas
Bridges on the National Register of Historic Places in Kansas
Bridges completed in 1914
Arch bridges in the United States